Thomas van der Mars (born 15 November 1990) is a Dutch professional basketball player for Heroes Den Bosch of the BNXT League. Standing at 6 ft 10 in (2.08 m), he usually plays as center.

Early career
A native of Gouda, van der Mars played for Canarias Basketball Academy in Spain.

College 
Thomas van der Mars played four years at Portland, averaging 13.5 pts and 7.2 rebs as a junior and 10.4 pts and 8.0 rebs as a senior.

Professional career
In August 2015, Van der Mars signed with Kavala B.C. of the Greek Basket League. In January 2016, he parted ways with Kavala and signed with AVIS Rapla of the Estonian KML. Van der Mars had a successful season, as he claimed KML Most Valuable Player and All-KML Team honors on his way to the league finals. Over the 2017–18 season, he averaged 15.5 points (fifth in the league) and 12.3 rebounds per game (first in the league). With Rapla, he qualified for the team's first ever KML finals. However, Van der Mars and Rapla lost to Kalev Cramo, being swept 0–4.

In the 2017 offseason, he signed with Estonian defending champions Kalev Cramo.

On 4 July 2018, Van der Mars signed with Crelan Okapi Aalstar of the Belgian Pro Basketball League (PBL).

On 30 July 2019, van der Mars returned to the Netherlands by signing a three-year contract with New Heroes Den Bosch of the Dutch Basketball League (DBL). On 29 May 2022, he won his first national title with Den Bosch and was named the BNXT Dutch Finals MVP after averaging 11.4 points and 9.4 rebounds in the series against ZZ Leiden. Van der Mars had a game-high 16 rebounds in the decisive Game 5 win away in Leiden and was praised for his defence on Leiden' star player Asbjørn Midtgaard. 

On 13 June 2022, he re-signed with Den Bosch for two more seasons; extending his contract to 2024.

International career
Van der Mars made his debut for the Netherlands national basketball team on 5 August 2016, in an 84–79 loss against Poland.

External links
Portland Pilots bio

References

1990 births
Living people
BC Kalev/Cramo players
Centers (basketball)
Dutch Basketball League players
Dutch expatriate basketball people in the United States
Dutch men's basketball players
Dutch expatriate basketball people in Estonia
Heroes Den Bosch players
Kavala B.C. players
Korvpalli Meistriliiga players
Okapi Aalstar players
Van der Mars, Thomas
Rapla KK players
Sportspeople from Gouda, South Holland
Dutch expatriate basketball people in Belgium
Dutch expatriate basketball people in Greece
Dutch expatriate basketball people in Spain